Major General Charles Ramsay Stirling Stein (January 5, 1897 – June 3, 1973) was a Canadian Army officer who commanded the 5th Canadian (Armoured) Division during World War II.

Education
He studied at the Royal Military College of Canada in Kingston, Ontario earning a war certificate in 1915 (College Number 1089).

Career
He served in World War I and remained in the army, attending the British Staff College, Camberley.

He served in the Royal Canadian Engineers. He returned to RMC from 1936-40 as Lieutenant Colonel staff-adjutant. In May 1939, he announced to the RMC on behalf of the Commandant 816 Brigadier K. Stuart that the present class would not be offered commissions until June 1941. This decision was made because the government had decided that an applicant for a Canadian commission had to be at least 20 years old. Ex-cadets were delighted by this policy. The largest recruit class since World War I, one hundred cadets, arrived in Kingston, Ontario in August 1940. He was promoted to Brigadier, General Staff, army headquarters and Major-General Commanding Officer of the 5th Canadian (Armoured) Division from January 1943 to October 1943. He was relieved from duty on medical grounds in 1943.

After the war, Stein led civil defence work in British Columbia.

Notes

References
H16511 Dr. Richard Arthur Preston "To Serve Canada: A History of the Royal Military College of Canada" 1997 Toronto, University of Toronto Press, 1969.
H16511 Dr. Richard Arthur Preston "Canada's RMC - A History of Royal Military College" Second Edition 1982

Bibliography

External links
Generals of World War II

1897 births
Date of death unknown
Military history of Canada
Royal Military College of Canada alumni
Year of death unknown
Canadian Army generals of World War II
Graduates of the Staff College, Camberley
Canadian military personnel of World War I
Royal Canadian Engineers officers
1973 deaths
Canadian generals